Ulrike Weichelt (born 25 February 1977) is a German former cyclist. She competed in the women's 500 metres time trial at the 2000 Summer Olympics.

References

External links
 

1977 births
Living people
German female cyclists
Olympic cyclists of Germany
Cyclists at the 2000 Summer Olympics
Cyclists from Dresden
People from Bezirk Dresden